Manchu Bhakthavatsalam, credited and also known as Mohan Babu, is an Indian actor and producer known for his works predominantly in Telugu cinema. An alumnus of the Madras Film Institute, Mohan Babu has acted in more than 500 films in lead, supporting and a variety of roles.

In 1995, he received Filmfare Award for Best Actor – Telugu for his work in the multi-starrer Pedarayudu, which also starred Rajinikanth in a pivotal role. In 2007, he received the CineMAA Award for Best Supporting Actor for his work in Yamadonga. Mohan Babu was honored at the University of California, Berkeley for his contribution to the field of cinema and education. He is the co-owner of production companies such as Sree Lakshmi Prasanna Pictures, 24 Frames Factory and Manchu Entertainment. In 2017, he garnered the Filmfare Lifetime Achievement Award – South. In 2017, he received the "Special Appreciation Award" for completing "forty years in cinema" at the 6th South Indian International Movie Awards.

A former Physical Education Instructor, Mohan Babu is a noted educationalist, and operates Sree Vidyanikethan Educational Institutions, and is the founder of Sree Vidyanikethan Educational Trust. Mohan Babu announces the Mohan Babu University named after himself in Tirupati at Sree Vidyanikethan Sree Sainath Nagar, formerly know as Sree Vidyanikethan Educational Institutions in January 2022 and he is the chancellor of the University.

Early life
Mohan Babu was born to Manchu Narayanaswamy and Manchu Lakshmamma in the Modhugulapalem village near Tirupati.

Career
Mohan Babu began his career as a Physical education instructor at the YMCA college of physical education for many years.

During this time, Mohan Babu was introduced to Dasari Narayana Rao who was then a script writer in Telugu cinema. This would pan out to become the most significant event of his career. Mohan Babu's first major breakthrough as an actor came with the 1975 film Swargam Narakam, directed by Dasari Narayana Rao. Dasari cast him as a villain in the movie and went on to achieve great success. It was after this movie that his birth name Bakthavatsalam Naidu was changed to Mohan Babu. After appearing in many films as a comedy-villain, he proceeded to star as the leading actor in Khaidi Kalidasu, Ketugadu, Gruha Pravesam, Assembly Rowdy, Allari Mogudu and many more. After receiving success in Telugu Cinema, Mohan Babu as a lover of arts was also drawn to the happenings of Tamil Cinema. After being initiated into the Tamil Film Industry by Sivaji Ganesan, he went on to appear in Tamil films.

In 1978, he appeared in Sivaranjani. The movie heralded the 'villain' and also came out with many of the mannerisms. He had an outstanding mentor in the form of Dasari Narayana Rao, who guided him in the right direction and gave him the initial foundation substratum he required to do well. Mohan Babu followed this success by portraying a variety of roles in his next films such as Simha Garjana (1978), Simha Baludu (1978), Rama Krishnulu (1978), Padaharella Vayasu (1978), Nayudu Bava (1978), Shokilla Rayudu (1979) and Ravanude Ramudayithe? (1979). His roles in Patnam Vachina Pativrathalu (1982), Billa Ranga (1978), Dharma Poratam (1983), Padmavyooham (1984), Bhale Ramudu (1984) and Sanchalanam (1985), showed a diverse range, despite often playing the villain.

His next film Soorarai Pottru (2020) was released on OTT platform Amazon Prime, and in Telugu as Aakaasam Nee Haddhu Raa.

As of October 2020, he launched Son of India a Telugu film, directed by Diamond Ratnababu and produced by Vishnu Manchu. Mohan Babu has penned screenplay for the film.

Though not announced officially, Mohan Babu declared that his next films would be mythological film Ravana Brahma and historical film Bhakta Kannappa.

Producer

As an ardent admirer of N.T. Rama Rao, in the year 1993, Mohan Babu produced Major Chandrakanth, starring N.T. Rama Rao and himself . The movie was directed by K. Raghavendra Rao, and went on to become a major blockbuster. The movie also celebrated its silver jubilee and stands as the last movie in N.T. Rama Rao's film career.

Contributions to education

Mohan Babu established the Sree Vidyanikethan Educational Trust in 1993. Today, Sree Vidyanikethan runs the Sree Vidyanikethan International School, Sree Vidyanikethan Degree College, Sree Vidyanikethan Engineering College, Sree Vidyanikethan College of Pharmacy, Sree Vidyanikethan College of Nursing and Sree Vidyanikethan Institute of Management.

Mohan Babu established university in Tirupati named after him 'Mohan Babu University' in January 2022, encompasses the educational institutions hitherto managed by the actor under the Sree Vidyanikethan Educational Trust(SVET) which he had established in 1993, and he is the founder and chancellor of the University.

Activism

Political views

While serving his tenure in the Rajya Sabha, he was also a member of the Committee on Human Resource Development from 1996 to 1997, the committee on Urban and Rural Development and the Consultative Committee for the Ministry of Information and Broadcasting.

After leaving the TDP, Mohan Babu continued with his career in the film industry. While in the midst of producing a movie titled Sri Ramuliah, he narrowly escaped a bomb blast which killed 23 people and injuring 35 others in Jubilee Hills, Hyderabad.

Mohan Babu is also known to have actively participated in improving the living standards of many underprivileged artists in the South Indian Film Industry. Mohan Babu stayed away from politics after NTR's demise. He joined YSR Congress Party in 2019 and campaigned for Y. S. Jaganmohan Reddy in becoming CM. Though not actively involved in political activities, he raises his voice against any injustice in the society. There are speculations that BJP has invited Mohan Babu to join the national party as he met PM Narendra Modi along with his family in the beginning of 2020.

Humanitarian work
Due to severe drought, the Rayalaseema people and agrarian community were cut off from necessary food supplies. Due to the event, plenty of people suffered from starvation. During his tenure as a Rajya Sabha MP, Mohan Babu visited the drought hit region and created some solutions to help the victims of famine. 
 
Mohan Babu developed his love of acting and passed it along to his children, with three kids following his footsteps into the film and education sector and carrying on his legacy. His daughter Lakshmi Manchu was appointed as the brand ambassador of Swachh Bharat Abhiyan by the Prime Minister of India. Manchu Vishnu and Manchu Manoj have undertaken many initiatives to improve the condition of underprivileged children who were flood victims in the past.

Personal life
Mohan Babu was married to Vidya Devi, with whom he has a son, Manchu Vishnu, and a daughter, Manchu Lakshmi Prasanna, who are both actors in the film industry. After her death, he married her younger sister, Nirmala Devi, with whom he has a son Manchu Manoj, also an actor.

Awards and nominations 
In 2007, he was awarded Padma Shri for his contribution to Art and Education.
Filmfare Lifetime Achievement Award – South (2016).
Filmfare Best Actor Award (Telugu) – Peddarayudu (1995)
SIIMA Special Appreciation Award (2017) 
CineMAA Award for Best Supporting Actor – Yamadonga (2008)
Honorary doctorate at the 26th convocation of the Dr. MGR University. in Chennai, Tamil Nadu on 5 October 2017.
 TSR Kalaparishath honoured him with the title Natavachaspathi for his valuable contribution to the Telugu cinema.
 The Glory of India International Award.
‘Viswa Nata Sarvabhouma’ title at Shilpakala Vedika in Hyderabad by Former Union Minister and filmmaker T. Subbarami Reddy.

Dialogue Book
As he completed 40 years in the film industry, the actor's popular dialogues were compiled in a book, named "Dialogue Book".

Filmography

References

External links
 

1952 births
Living people
Recipients of the Padma Shri in arts
People from Chittoor district
Telugu male actors
Male actors in Tamil cinema
Filmfare Awards South winners
M.G.R. Government Film and Television Training Institute alumni
Telugu Desam Party politicians
YSR Congress Party politicians